Hans Nordin (born 23 September 1952 in Stockholm, Sweden), is a Swedish guide, fishing guide, TV-host, and author. Nordin participated in over 40 programs on Swedish Television SVT, Swedish TV4, and TV-shows in Germany and Czechoslovakia. He is a regular contributor to Swedish and international Sport Fishing journals, including Fiskejournalen for more than twenty years.

TV-shows and documentaries
 1989-91 Fisketur (Fishing Tour with Hans Nordin) Vignette.
 Three seasons in Swedish Public Broadcast Television SVT Sommarlov ("Summer Camps"), for a total of 29 episodes, where Nordin also was programme manager and co-author of script.
 1999-2001 Nordic Good Fishing, TV-documentary series, SVT broadcast in the TV Show Mitt i Naturen (In the Middle of Nature).
 2003 Skärgårdstugg (Chewable Archipelago) TV series, Swedish TV4.
 2004/05 Jakt och Fiske (Hunting and Fishing) TV series, Swedish TV4.
 2011 Fiska lite djupare (Fishing a little deeper) TV series episode 5, Swedish TV4 sport.

Books

 1995 Wobbler, Self-Production for a Fun Sport Angling. Published in Sweden  and in Germany, Austria, Switzerland 
 2001 Modern Ice Angling. Published in Sweden, Finland,  North America/USA, Russia

Awards
 1989 Honorary statue - Swedish Sportfishing Federation. Host of the TV series Fisketur (Fishing Tour) 1989.
 2006 Gold drill (Guldborren) for contributions to the Swedish ice fishing.

References

External links
 TV-series Nordic Good Fishing 
 The Swedish Media Database (SMDB)
 TV-series Fisketur (Fishing Tour) TV Vignette, season 1991
 Jakt och Fiske TV 4
 Selected episodes of TV-series Fishing Tour (Fisketur) as Video also includes cover of the book Woobler
 12 works in 18 publications in 5 languages and 286 library holdings 
 Book: Modernt Ismete (Modern Ice Fishing) Bokus
Modern Ice Fishing in Finnish language TALVIONGINTA
 Book: Wobbler - Topmodelle in eigenbau (German)

Swedish television hosts
Swedish male writers
1952 births
Living people